Pusia microzonias is a species of sea snail, a marine gastropod mollusk, in the family Costellariidae, the ribbed miters.

References

External links
 W.O.Cernohorsky, The Mitridae of Fiji - The Veliger v. 8 (1965-1966)

microzonias